The Roman Catholic Diocese of Eldoret is a diocese located in the city of Eldoret in the Ecclesiastical province of Kisumu in Kenya.

History
 June 29, 1953: Established as Apostolic Prefecture of Eldoret from the Diocese of Kisumu
 October 13, 1959: Promoted as Diocese of Eldoret

Bishops

Ordinaries
 Prefect Apostolic of Eldoret (Roman rite) 
 Father Joseph Brendan Houlihan, S.P.S. (1954 - 13 Oct 1959); see below
 Bishops of Eldoret (Roman rite)
 Bishop Joseph Brendan Houlihan, S.P.S. (13 Oct 1959  – 19 Oct 1970); see above
 Bishop John Njenga (19 Oct 1970  – 25 Oct 1988), appointed Bishop of Mombasa; future Archbishop
 Bishop Cornelius Kipng’eno Arap Korir (2 Apr 1990  – 30 Oct 2017); given the 2009 Milele lifetime achievement award from Kenya's National Commission on Human Rights
 Bishop Dominic Kimengich  (16 Nov 2019 -)

Priests

Father Anthony Kiplagat is on loan from this diocese to the Archdiocese of Kansas City, Kansas, USA. He is serving as parochial administrator of St. Patrick Parish in Osage City, Kansas, USA and St. Patrick Parish in Scranton, KS.  Father Anthony is from the town of Kapkemich and assisted in the creation of St. Anne's Girls' School.

http://st-annes-girls-school.com/about_st_annes_girls_school_kapkemich_kenya.aspx

See also
Roman Catholicism in Kenya
Kenya Conference of Catholic Bishops http://www.kccb.or.ke/

References

Sources
 GCatholic.org
 Catholic Hierarchy
 The Leaven. 

Roman Catholic dioceses in Kenya
Christian organizations established in 1959
Eldoret
Roman Catholic dioceses and prelatures established in the 20th century
Roman Catholic Ecclesiastical Province of Kisumu